Count Franz Graf von Pocci (7 March 1807 – 7 May 1876) was a significant official in the court of King Ludwig the First of Bavaria, best known as the founding director of the Munich Marionette Theatre where he was a shadow puppeteer and wrote countless puppet plays and children's stories.

Pocci, in collaboration with Josef Schmid, founded the Munich Marionette Theatre in Munich, Bavaria, Germany in 1855. He hired the premises, drew stage curtains and designs, and wrote pieces for the hero of Schmid's shows, Kasperl Larifari, a descendant of Hans Wurst and all the classical comic figures in traditional European puppetry. This collaboration was highly influential and is credited with inspiring the formation of other theaters, most notably the Salzburg Marionettes under Anton Aicher in 1913 in Salzburg, Bavaria, and the Toelz Marionette Theater.

Work

A German dramatist, poet, painter, and composer, Pocci is credited by the Munich Marionette Theatre with inventing the Punch and Judy Show, and contributing a remarkable 45 original works to the theatre's library. Some were based on traditional classical plots, and some were his own inventions. Among his most prominent fairy‐tale plays are Blaubart (Bluebeard, 1845), Schattenspiel (Shadow Play, 1847), Hänsel und Gretel (Hansel and Gretel, 1861), Zaubergeige (The Magic Violin, 1868), Eulenschloss (The Castle of Owls, 1869), Kasperl wird reich (Punch Becomes Rich, 1872). Pocci combined comic features of the Punch and Judy shows with fantastic elements of the traditional fairy tales to create social farces aimed at enlightening and amusing children.

In addition to his literary work, his role as director saw him provide political and financial support to the organisation, acting as patron, landlord, and backer, and supporting the dreams of Schmid, his collaborator.

He was also responsible for drawing illustrations for collections of fairy tales by Charles Perrault, the Brothers Grimm, and Hans Christian Andersen. Figures from his productions of The Fat Gentleman and The Serenade are still in existence today, and his best known stories The Stranger Child: A Legend and The Nutcracker Dwarf are still in wide circulation.

Pocci's art and poetry were also published in his own books, including Rhymes and Pictures for Children and Viola Tricolor: In Picture and Rhyme. His images from the latter are printed in chromolithography. He is responsible for both the art and the verse in the book, and both are noteworthy.

Notes

Bibliography

External links

 
 

German puppeteers
19th-century German painters
German male painters
German designers
Performing arts presenters
Theatre people from Munich
Counts of Germany
1807 births
1876 deaths
German male writers
19th-century German male artists
Writers from Munich